The 2018 Saint Louis FC season is the club's fourth season of existence, and their fourth consecutive season in the United Soccer League, the second tier of American soccer. Saint Louis will additionally compete in the U.S. Open Cup. The season covers the period from October 16, 2017 to the beginning of the 2019 USL season.

Saint Louis moved back to the Western Conference this season, after spending 2017 in the Eastern Conference. The team will also have a new head coach this season, with Anthony Pulis coming over from Orlando City B.

Roster

Competitions

Preseason
Saint Louis revealed their preseason schedule on January 18. They announced six games over a span of about a month, with three coming against collegiate programs, two against an adult amateur club, and one against a fellow professional team. Saint Louis opened preseason with two games in Florida, followed by three games back in Missouri and the finale in Indiana.

U.S. Open Cup

USL

Standings

Results summary

Results by round

Match results
In August 2017, the USL announced that the 2018 season will span 34 games, the longest regular season the league has ever run. The expansion was spurred by the addition of six new clubs for the 2018 season: Atlanta United 2, Fresno FC, Indy Eleven, Las Vegas Lights, Nashville SC, and North Carolina FC.

On January 14, 2018, the league announced home openers for every club. Saint Louis opened the season on the road against Rio Grande Valley FC Toros, opening the 2018 USL season from Edinburg. The club had to wait until March 31 to open up Toyota Stadium, hosting Colorado Springs Switchbacks in their home opener.

The schedule for the remainder of the 2018 season was released on January 19. Saint Louis will play three times against Swope Park Rangers and Tulsa Roughnecks. They will face every other Western Conference team twice.

Postseason

See also
 Saint Louis FC
 2018 in American soccer
 2018 USL season

References

Saint Louis FC seasons
Saint Louis FC
Saint Louis FC
Saint Louis FC